"The Use of Force" is a short story by the American author William Carlos Williams. It was first published in his short story collection Life Along the Passaic River (1938); it is also available in The Doctor Stories (1984), a collection of Williams' fiction that is still in print.

Summary
The story is narrated in the first person by a physician, who is making a house call to tend to a sick girl.  Fearing she may have diphtheria, the doctor decides to check her throat.  However, the girl refuses to open her mouth, and the doctor uses force to restrain her and examine her throat with a spoon, which angers the girl.  The doctor finds that, against her own interest, the girl has hidden the symptoms of the infection from her parents and the doctor.

Analysis
The story is written without the use of quotation marks, and the dialogue is not distinguished from the narrator's comments. The story is rendered from the subjective point of view of the doctor and explores both his admiration for the child and disgust with the parents, and his guilty enjoyment of forcefully subduing the stubborn child in an attempt to acquire the throat sample. The overall theme of the story revolves around power and submission, and the doctor's unnerved feeling during the forceful encounter.

References

1938 short stories
Short stories by William Carlos Williams